Walter Simmons is a fictional character on the CBS crime drama CSI: Miami, portrayed by actor Omar Benson Miller.

Background
Simmons, a Louisiana native and fluent French speaker, is a CSI from the night shift who transfers to Horatio Caine's day shift team in season 8. He is an art theft specialist promoted to the main cast after three episodes.

Relationship With Colleagues
Simmons generally has a good working relationship with all the team members. His sense of humor has made him a likeable personality amongst his more senior colleagues. He was especially close to Jesse Cardoza and often played basketball with him. Ryan Wolfe took him under his wing, and the duo have a friendly relationship, though Wolfe occasionally enjoys "pulling the seniority card" and leaves Simmons with the undesirable tasks.

Initially he was distrustful of veteran CSI Eric Delko when Delko was conducting undercover investigations in the episode "Time Bomb", but has since had a mutual respect for him after Delko exonerates Wolfe.

On the job
Despite his stature, Simmons seems to be easily frightened by large animals and human remains. Hence he is rarely seen in the autopsy room and handles trace evidence instead.

As the lowest ranking CSI, Simmons is sometimes given the dirtier and unwanted tasks, such as retrieving a dead man flushed down a toilet and collecting trace from a large pile of rocks.

In the episode "Hunting Ground" it is revealed that he speaks French fluently while the episode, "Bad Seed", reveals that he also a strong knowledge of poisons and toxins which proves helpful to the team.

Much like Ryan Wolfe in his debut appearance, Simmons refers to Horatio as "sir" rather than "Lt" or even "H" which Ryan and Eric often call him although he has started referring to Horatio as "H" but still calls him "sir" at times.

Also, despite being right-handed, Simmons wears his watch on his right wrist.

References

CSI: Miami characters
Fictional characters from Louisiana
Fictional forensic scientists
Television characters introduced in 2009